Pyrrhotite is an iron sulfide mineral with the formula Fe(1-x)S (x = 0 to 0.2).  It is a nonstoichiometric variant of FeS, the mineral known as troilite.
Pyrrhotite is also called magnetic pyrite, because the color is similar to pyrite and it is weakly magnetic. The magnetism decreases as the iron content decreases, and troilite is non-magnetic.

Structure
Pyrrhotite exists as a number of polytypes of hexagonal or monoclinic crystal symmetry; several polytypes often occur within the same specimen. Their structure is based on the NiAs unit cell. As such, Fe occupies an octahedral site and the sulfide centers occupy trigonal prismatic sites.

Materials with the NiAs structure often are non-stoichiometric because they lack up to 1/8th fraction of the metal ions, creating vacancies. One of such structures is pyrrhotite-4C (Fe7S8). Here "4" indicates that iron vacancies define a superlattice that is 4 times larger than the unit cell in the "C" direction. The C direction is conventionally chosen parallel to the main symmetry axis of the crystal; this direction usually corresponds to the largest lattice spacing. Other polytypes include: pyrrhotite-5C (Fe9S10), 6C (Fe11S12),  7C (Fe9S10) and 11C (Fe10S11). Every polytype can have monoclinic (M) or hexagonal (H) symmetry, and therefore some sources label them, for example, not as 6C, but 6H or 6M depending on the symmetry.
The monoclinic forms are stable at temperatures below 254 °C, whereas the hexagonal forms are stable above that temperature. The exception is for those with high iron content, close to the troilite composition (47 to 50% atomic percent iron) which exhibit hexagonal symmetry.

Magnetic properties
The ideal FeS lattice, such as that of troilite, is non-magnetic. Magnetic properties vary with Fe content. More Fe-rich, hexagonal pyrrhotites are antiferromagnetic. However, the Fe-deficient, monoclinic  Fe7S8 is ferrimagnetic. The ferromagnetism which is widely observed in pyrrhotite is therefore attributed to the presence of relatively large concentrations of iron vacancies (up to 20%) in the crystal structure. Vacancies lower the crystal symmetry. Therefore, monoclinic forms of pyrrhotite are in general more defect-rich than the more symmetrical hexagonal forms, and thus are more magnetic. Monoclinic pyrrhotite undergoes a magnetic transition known as the Besnus transition at 30 K that leads to a loss of magnetic remanence. The saturation magnetization of pyrrhotite is 0.12 tesla.

Identification

Physical Properties 
Pyrrhotite is brassy, bronze, or dark brown in color with a metallic luster and uneven or subconchoidal fracture. Pyrrhotite may be confused with other brassy sulfide minerals like pyrite, chalcopyrite, or pentlandite. Certain diagnostic characteristics can be used for identification in hand samples. Unlike other common brassy-colored sulfide minerals, pyrrhotite is typically magnetic (varies inversely with iron content). On the Mohs hardness scale, pyrrhotite ranges from 3.5 to 4, compared to 6 to 6.5 for pyrite. Streak can be used when properties between pyrrhotite and other sulfide minerals are similar. Pyrrhotite displays a dark grey to black streak. Pyrite will display a greenish black to brownish black streak, chalcopyrite will display a greenish black streak, and pentlandite leaves a pale bronze-brown streak. Pyrrhotite generally displays massive to granular crystal habit, and may show tabular/prismatic or hexagonal crystals which are sometimes iridescent.

Diagnostic characteristics in hand samples include: brassy/bronze colour when paired with a grey/black streak, tabular or hexagonal crystals which show iridescence, subconchoidal fracture, metallic luster, and magnestism.

Optical Properties 
Pyrrhotite is an opaque mineral and will therefore not transmit light. As a result, pyrrhotite will display extinction when viewed under plane polarized light and cross polarized light, making identification with petrographic polarizing light microscopes difficult. Pyrrhotite, and other opaque minerals can be identified optically using a reflected light ore microscope (which contains an upper reflecting polarizing light illuminator). As such, the following optical properties are representative of polished/puck sections using ore microscopy:

Pyrrhotite typically appears as anhedral, granular aggregates and is cream-pink to brownish in color. Weak to strong reflection pleochroism which may be seen along grain boundaries. Pyrrhotite has similar polishing hardness to pentlandite (medium), is softer than pyrite, and harder than chalcopyrite. Pyrrhotite will not display twinning or internal reflections, and its strong anisotropy from yellow to greenish-gray or grayish-blue is characteristic.

Diagnostic characteristics in polished section include: anhedral aggregates, cream-pink to brown in color which display strong anisotropy.

Occurrence
Pyrrhotite is a rather common trace constituent of mafic igneous rocks especially norites. It occurs as segregation deposits in layered intrusions associated with pentlandite, chalcopyrite and other sulfides. It is an important constituent of the Sudbury intrusion (1.85 Ga old meteorite impact crater in Ontario, Canada) where it occurs in masses associated with copper and nickel mineralisation. It also occurs in pegmatites and in contact metamorphic zones. Pyrrhotite is often accompanied by pyrite, marcasite and magnetite. Pyrrhotite does not have specific applications. It is mined primarily because it is associated with pentlandite, sulfide mineral that can contain significant amounts of nickel and cobalt.

Etymology and history
The name pyrrhotite is derived from Greek pyrrhos, flame-colored.

Issues

Pyrrhotite has been linked to crumbling concrete basements in Quebec, Massachusetts and Connecticut when local quarries included it in their concrete mixtures. The iron sulfide it contains can react with oxygen and water over time to cause swelling and cracking.

References

External links
 

Sulfide minerals
Iron minerals
Monoclinic minerals
Minerals in space group 15
Magnetic minerals